Tom Doedee (born 1 March 1997) is a professional Australian rules footballer playing for the Adelaide Football Club in the Australian Football League (AFL).

Early life 
Doedee excelled as a junior basketballer from the age of six playing as a Point Guard in the Geelong Supercats junior teams. He also played junior football for St Joseph's in Geelong Football League.

He played for Victoria Country in the 2012 under-18 Australian basketball championships.

He sat out the Geelong Falcons 2014 preseason to concentrate on basketball, hoping for a possible scholarship in the United States. He played for Victoria Country in the under-18 Australian basketball championships in Canberra. He averaged six points and two assists from nine games.

He returned for the 2015 preseason at the Falcons but was hampered by injury and almost didn't make the cut. It forced him to start the practise matches in the equivalent of a Falcons’ reserves side. However, once injury-free Doedee impressed at Centre Half Back for the Falcons and played for Victoria Country in the AFL Under 18 Championships. Doedee was also invited to the Draft Combine where he finished fifth in the agility test and ninth in the relative vertical jump.

Prior to the 2015 AFL draft Doedee was regarded as the best one-on-one defender in the TAC Cup by Geelong Falcons talent manager Michael Turner and was tipped to be drafted around 35-40 overall.

AFL career 
Doedee was drafted by Adelaide with their second selection and seventeenth overall in the 2015 national draft. In his second match, the thirty-six point win against  at the Adelaide Oval in round two of the 2018 season, Doedee recorded twenty-five disposals and six marks to earn the round AFL Rising Star nomination. In 2018, Doedee extended his contract by two years (until 2021) after missing just two games of the season. He placed second in the 2018 AFL Rising Star after averaging 18 disposals and two intercept marks per match. However, during the first round of the 2019 season, he ruptured his ACL in the second quarter of the 32 point loss to Hawthorn and did not return for the remainder of the season. In the 2020 season, shortened to 18 rounds due to the COVID-19 pandemic, Tom played nine games but a hamstring injury ruled him out for the last seven games for the season. Tom captained the club for a couple of games due to the absence of captain Rory Sloane and vice-captain Tom Lynch. He was picked over the two other available leadership team members (Matt Crouch and Brodie Smith) and was only 23 years old with 26 games experience.

References

External links

1997 births
Living people
Adelaide Football Club players
Geelong Falcons players
Australian rules footballers from Victoria (Australia)
Adelaide Football Club (SANFL) players
Australian people of Dutch descent